The Pothohar Plateau (or Pothwar) (Punjabi) is a plateau in north-eastern Pakistan, located between Indus River and the Jhelum River, forming the northern part of Punjab.

Geography
Pothohar Plateau is bounded on the east by the Jhelum River, on the west by the Indus River, on the north by the Kala Chitta Range and the Margalla Hills, and on the south by the Salt Range. The southern end of the plateau is bounded by the Thal desert. The 5000 square miles of the plateau range from an average height of 1200 to 1900 feet above the sea level. Sakesar in the Salt Range is the highest mountain of the region and Tilla Jogian is the second highest.

One of the five rivers of the Punjab, the Jhelum River flows through the Pothohar.

The Sivapithecus indicus fossil skull of an extinct ape species was discovered in Potohar plateau.

History
The earliest evidence of human habitation in Punjab traces to the Soan valley of the Pothohar, where Soanian culture developed between 774,000 BC and 11,700 BC. This period goes back to the first interglacial period in the second Ice Age, from which remnants of stone and flint tools have been found.

The Punjab played a major role in the war effort of World War II, and a large proportion of these soldiers came from the Pothohar as well as the Salt Range.

Demography
The native people of the Pothohar are Punjabis, who speak Punjabi and its dialects. Pothwari is named after the region, and other commonly spoken dialects include Majhi. The culture of the region is Punjabi. 

The major biradaris of the region (Punjabi: برادری) include Rajputs, Jatts, Awans, Janjuas, Gujjars, Khokhars, and Gakhars. Prior to the partition of India, other biradaris including the Khatris, Mohyal Brahmins, and Aroras were also present in large numbers throughout the region.

Economy
The plateau covers about 7 percent of all the cultivated land of Pakistan and most of it is very fertile, but the region does not have any proper irrigation system, with the agriculture being largely dependent on rainfall.

The plateau is the location of major Pakistani oil fields, the first of which were discovered at Khaur in 1915 and Dhuliān in 1935; the Tut field was discovered in 1968, Missa Keswal was discovered in 1992 and exploration continued in the area in the 1990s. The oil fields are connected by pipeline to the Attock Refinery in Rawalpindi.
Major reserves of oil and gas has been discovered at Chak Beli Khan near Rawalpindi in Punjab. A major oil reserve has been discovered near Jhelum in Punjab, opening up a new area for exploitation of hydrocarbon potential (e.g., Meyal Field). With an estimated production of 5,500 barrels per day, the Ghauri X-1 oil well is expected to be the country’s largest oil-producing well and is likely to start contributing its output to the system by the end of June 2014.

Due to low rain fall, extensive deforestation, coal mining, oil and gas exploration, the area is becoming devoid of vegetation.

Important sites

Taxila
The sites were first excavated by John Marshall, who worked at Taxila over a period of twenty years from 1913.

The vast archaeological site includes neolithic remains dating to 3360 BCE, and Early Harappan remains dating to 2900–2600 BCE at Sarai Kala. Taxila, however, is most famous for ruins of several settlements, the earliest dating from around 1000 BCE. It is also known for its collection of Buddhist religious monuments, including the Dharmarajika stupa, the Jaulian monastery, and the Mohra Muradu monastery.

The main ruins of Taxila include four major cities, each belonging to a distinct time period, at three different sites. The earliest settlement at Taxila is found in the Hathial section, which yielded pottery shards that date from as early as the late 2nd millennium BCE to the 6th century BCE. The Bhir Mound ruins at the site date from the 6th century BCE, and are adjacent to Hathial. The ruins of Sirkap date to the 2nd century BCE, and were built by the region's Greco-Bactrian kings who ruled in the region following Alexander the Great's invasion of the region in 326 BCE. The third and most recent settlement is that of Sirsukh, which was built by rulers of the Kushan empire, who ruled from nearby Purushapura (modern Peshawar).

Rohtas Fort

Rohtas Fort is a 16th-century fortress located near the city of Jhelum in the Punjab province of Pakistan. The fort is one of the largest and most formidable in the subcontinent. Rohtas Fort was never taken by force, and it has remained remarkably intact.

The fortress was built by Raja Todar Mal on the orders of Sher Shah Suri.

The fort is known for its large defensive walls and several monumental gateways. Rohtas Fort was declared a UNESCO World Heritage Site in 1997, as an "exceptional example of the Muslim military architecture of Central and South Asia."

Katas Raj Temples
The Katas Raj Temples also known as Qila Katas, is a complex of several Hindu temples connected to one another by walkways. The temple complex surrounds a pond named Katas which is regarded as sacred by Hindus.

The temples' pond is said in the Puranas to have been created from the teardrops of Shiva, after he wandered the Earth inconsolable after the death of his wife Sati. The pond occupies an area of two kanals and 15 marlas, with a maximum depth of 20 feet.

The temples play a role in the Hindu epic poem, the Mahābhārata, where the temples are traditionally believed to have been the site where the Pandava brothers spent a significant portion of their exile.

Rawat Fort
Rawat Fort is an early 16th century fort in the Pothohar plateau of Pakistan, near the city of Rawalpindi in the province of Punjab. The fort was built to defend the Pothohar plateau from the forces of the Pashtun king Sher Shah Suri.

Notable People

 Mian Muhammad Bakhsh - Punjabi Sufi Poet
 Raja Pervaiz Ashraf, Former prime minister of Pakistan
 Hadiqa Kiani - Pakistani singer, actress, and philanthropist.
 Shoaib Akhtar - Former Cricketer known as "The Rawalpindi Express"
 Muhammad Amir - Cricketer
 Haris Rauf - Cricketer
 Raja Muhammad Sarwar - first recipient of Nishan-e-Haider, the highest military award of Pakistan.
 Bari Imam - Sufi Saint
 Amir Khan - Former Boxer

See also
 Punjab region, and Pakistani Punjab
 Topography of Pakistan
 Mountain ranges of Pakistan
 List of Rulers of Pothohar Plateau

References

External links

Potwar Plateau – Encyclopædia Britannica from Encyclopædia Britannica Premium Service
Regional Studies of the Potwar Plateau Area, Northern Pakistan United States Geological Survey

Archaeological sites in Pakistan
Archaeological sites in Punjab, Pakistan
Geography of Pakistan
Geography of Punjab, Pakistan
Landforms of Pakistan
Landforms of Punjab (Pakistan)
Landforms of Azad Kashmir
Plateaus of Pakistan
Regions of Punjab, Pakistan
Regions of Pakistan